The National Alliance of Youth and Students for National Reunification, or the Pomchonghakryon, is a North Korea-based organization that promotes Korean reunification. It was founded on 15 August 1992, the 47th anniversary of the end of Japanese occupation on the Korean peninsula.

It considers the South Korea-based Hanchongryun (South Korean Federation of University Student Councils), which was a well-known target of the National Security Act in South Korea, as its southern headquarters. It also has an overseas branch based in Japan. It holds meetings roughly once a year, with the stated goal of ending the foreign domination and intervention in Korea and moving towards peaceful reunification of Korea.

See also
Korean unification

References 
 KCNA News, 14 December 1997, accessed 3 March 2006
 KCNA News, 17 August 1998, accessed 3 March 2006

External links 
 Pomchonghakryon (South branch) web site (in Korean)

Politics of South Korea
Politics of North Korea
Youth organizations based in North Korea
1992 establishments in North Korea
Student organizations established in 1992